The 1977 Florida Federal Open was a women's singles tennis tournament played on outdoor hard courts in Palm Harbor, Florida in the United States. The event was part of the A category of the 1977 Colgate Series. It was the fifth edition of the tournament and was held from September 26 through October 2, 1977. Unseeded Virginia Ruzici won the title and earned $6,000 first-prize money.

Finals

Singles
 Virginia Ruzici defeated  Laura DuPont 6–4, 4–6, 6–2
It was Ruzici's 2nd singles title of the year and the 6th of her career.

Doubles
 Linky Boshoff /  Ilana Kloss defeated  Brigitte Cuypers /  Marise Kruger 7–6(7–4), 6–3

Prize money

Notes

References

Florida Federal Open
Eckerd Open
Florida Federal Open
Florida Federal Open
Florida Federal Open
Florida Federal Open